CoRoT-3 is a white-yellow dwarf main sequence star hotter than the Sun. This star is located approximately 2560 light-years away in the constellation of Aquila.  The apparent magnitude of this star is 13, which means it is not visible to the naked eye but can be seen with a medium-sized amateur telescope on a clear dark night.

Planetary system
This star is home to object designated CoRoT-3b. This object was discovered by the CoRoT Mission spacecraft using the transit method. Measurements made using the radial velocity method show that this object is probably a brown dwarf.

See also
 List of extrasolar planets

References

External links
 

Aquila (constellation)
F-type main-sequence stars
Planetary systems with one confirmed planet
Planetary transit variables